The Depayin massacre occurred on 30 May 2003 in Tabayin (Depayin), a town in Myanmar's Sagaing Division (now Sagaing Region), when at least 70 people associated with the National League for Democracy were killed by a government-sponsored mob. In an April 2012 interview, Khin Nyunt, formerly the country's prime minister, claimed that he personally intervened to save Aung San Suu Kyi's life during the massacre, by mobilising his men to bring her to a safe location at a nearby army cantonment.

Commission observations
In making this statement, the Asian Legal Resource Centre concurs with the preliminary findings of the Ad Hoc Commission on the Depayin Massacre, presented on 25 June 2003. In its summary observations on the attack, the Ad Hoc Commission observed that the attack was clearly premeditated and well organised, as indicated by the following:

 Up to 5000 persons were brought to a remote rural location for the purpose of attacking the convoy.
 The attackers were all well-armed and located strategically at two killing sites.
 Before the motorcade arrived, local authorities threatened people living in nearby villages to stay indoors.
 The authorities systematically searched for and arrested survivors of the attack.

ALRC opinion
The Asian Legal Resource Centre is of the opinion that the massacre at Depayin clearly amounts to a "widespread or systematic attack directed against [a] civilian population, with a knowledge of the attack" (article 7.1 of the Rome Statute of the International Criminal Court) and is therefore a crime against humanity. To date, however, there has been no serious action taken on the massacre.

See also
 List of massacres in Burma

References

 www.ibiblio.org: Depayin Report

History of Myanmar (1948–present)
Massacres in Myanmar
2003 in Myanmar
Aung San Suu Kyi
Massacres in 2003
May 2003 crimes
May 2003 events in Asia
2003 crimes in Myanmar
2003 murders in Myanmar